Aldar may refer to:

Aldar Properties, a real estate development, management and investment company with headquarters in Abu Dhabi, United Arab Emirates
Aldar Tsydenzhapov, a conscript seaman of the destroyer Bystry of the Russian Pacific Fleet who was the only fatal victim of a fire that broke out on the destroyer on 28 September 2010. 
Akiva Aldar (born 1945), Israeli author and columnist

See also
Aldar Headquarters building, first circular building of its kind in the Middle East, located in Al Raha, Abu Dhabi, UAE
Dar (disambiguation)
Eldar (disambiguation)
Aldara (disambiguation)